Romain Chouleur (born 10 January 1986) is a French professional footballer who currently plays as a midfielder for ES Thaon.

He played on the professional level in Ligue 1 for AS Nancy, and has also represented US Raon-l'Étape and SAS Épinal.

Career statistics

External links
 
 Romain Chouleur at foot-national.com
 

1986 births
Living people
Sportspeople from Nancy, France
French footballers
Association football midfielders
AS Nancy Lorraine players
US Raon-l'Étape players
SAS Épinal players
ES Thaon players
Ligue 1 players
Championnat National players
Footballers from Grand Est